is a Filipina actress and singer of Japanese-Brazilian descent and a member of J-pop girl group Faky. She was born in Japan and was raised in France and the Philippines.

Career
Saito was an intro-acting student at Star Magic Workshops before.

Saito attended an acting workshop with celebrated director and coach Gina Alajar. She had mixed feelings about the experience but ultimately feels blessed to be trained by the veteran.

Saito started her acting career in #ParangNormal Activity, a horror-comedy show by TV5. She was paired with her first loveteam onscreen Ryle Paolo Tan.

Saito appeared as Allyson in Ismol Family, a weekly Filipino situational comedy of GMA Network. She appeared as a love triangle between Miguel Tanfelix (Tan Tan) and Bianca Umali (Yumi).

Saito played Suzanne "Sushie" Silang in Calle Siete a family comedy drama series broadcast by GMA Network, where she worked with Ryzza Mae Dizon, Eula Valdez and her loveteam Kenneth Medrano. The program premiered on June 13, 2016 and was aired worldwide on GMA Pinoy TV.

Saito is also known for being one of the lead stars in Trops, the late morning/early noontime show of GMA Network which aired on October 24, 2016 where she played the role of Martha Kiera "Taki" Masson. The show tackled the issues faced by the youth of today — peer pressure, friendship, rivalry, generation gap, and of course, romance. The love triangle of Kenneth Medrano, Miggy Tolentino and Taki Saito was one of the show’s highlights. But Kenneth Medrano still remained as her loveteam in the show.

On October 14, 2017 Saito returns on CMSI MUSIC TV For The show namely as Ready Set MORe!

On December 20, 2018 it was announced that Taki was a new member of the J-pop girl union "Faky".

Personal life
Saito was born in Shizuoka Prefecture, Japan. The family then moved to Paris, France, where they remained until Taki was 13 years old. The family then moved to Manila, Philippines where they have remained ever since. 

She is now currently living in Tokyo, Japan, since Oct 2018. Taki’s mother is half-Japanese and Spanish/Filipino, while her biological father is of Brazilian and Japanese descent, whom she never met personally. 

Even though she grew up abroad, she is fluent in speaking Tagalog because instead of studying in an international school, she studied in Colegio San Agustin - Southwoods for her to be familiar with the Filipino language. She also studied at Brent International School.

Filmography

Film

Television

Web

References

Living people
2000 births
Filipino child actresses
Filipino television actresses
Filipino television variety show hosts
TV5 (Philippine TV network) personalities
GMA Network personalities
Japanese women pop singers
Japanese female dancers
21st-century Japanese women singers
21st-century Japanese singers
J-pop singers
Filipino people of Japanese descent
Filipino people of Brazilian descent

External links
 
Avex Group artists